Kamp-e Sakhtmani Miduk (also Romanized as Kamp-e Sākhtmānī Mīdūk) is a village in Madvarat Rural District, in the Central District of Shahr-e Babak County, Kerman Province, Iran. At the 2006 census, its population was 175, in 59 families.

References 

Populated places in Shahr-e Babak County